Sughra (Punjabi) is a Pakistani politician who was elected from the platform of the Pakistan Peoples Partyserved from Punjab on a reserve seat for women.

Early life and education 
Syeda Sughra Imam belongs to a political family. She is the daughter of two politicians, Syed Fakhar Imam and Syeda Abida Hussain, was born on November 14, 1972 in Lahore.

Political career 
After graduation, she worked at the US based foreign policy think tank, the Council on Foreign Relations, New York City, and as a consultant to the United Nations Development Programme and other NGOs. She served as chairperson, Zila Council, Jhang during 1998-99, and has been elected as Member Provincial Assembly of the Punjab in General Elections 2002. She elected both times by joining the Pakistan Peoples Party.

She was appointed Minister for Social Welfare on 24 November 2003 and resigned on 18 June 2004. She belongs to a well known political family. Her maternal Grandfather Col. Syed Abid Hussain enjoyed the historic distinction of being elected as a Member of the Legislative/Constituent Assembly 1945 of undivided India. Col. Abid represented the Pakistan Muslim League in the parliament in Delhi under the leadership of Quaid-e-Azam Muhammad Ali Jinnah. He also served as Federal Minister Communication & Works (1951–53) in Prime Minister Hussain Shaheed Suhrahwardy's Cabinet.  Sughra's mother took on Col. Abid's mantle, becoming the first women in Pakistan's history to be elected chairperson of a district government, and the first women ever in Pakistan to be elected as a Member of National Assembly. Syeda Abida Hussain, Sughra's mother, remained Member of Punjab Assembly during 1972-77, Member of National Assembly 1985-88, 1988–90, 1997–99, and Pakistan's Ambassador in Washington, D.C. (1991–93). Sughra's father, Syed Fakhar Imam is currently Member National Assembly since 2018, also remained Member of National Assembly during 1985-88, 1990–93, and 1997–99; and served as Speaker of National Assembly during 1985-86. Fakhar Imam is remembered for resigning from his position as Federal Minister on a point of principle.

References

External links 
 World leaders forum , Columbia University participants

Punjab MPAs 2002–2007
Harvard University alumni
Living people
People from Jhang District
1972 births
Punjabi people
Pakistan Muslim League (N) MPAs (Punjab)
Women members of the Senate of Pakistan
21st-century Pakistani women politicians